Ronchi is both a given name and a surname. People with the name include:

Surname
Andrea Ronchi (born 1955), Italian politician
Edo Ronchi (born 1950), Italian engineer and politician
Luke Ronchi (born 1981), New Zealand cricketer
Pellegrino Tomaso Ronchi (1930–2018), Italian bishop
Sophie de Ronchi (born 1985), French swimmer
Vasco Ronchi (1897–1988), Italian physicist known for his work in optics

Given name
Ronchi Isa (1917–2005), Lebanese politician of the Netherlands Antilles

Italian-language surnames
Masculine given names